Pentahydroxybenzene (C6H6O5) is a chemical compound whose structure consists of a benzene ring with five hydroxy groups (–OH) as substituents. The compound forms white to pinkish crystals. It decomposes at 264–269 °C.

References 

Phenols